Triploidite is an uncommon manganese iron phosphate mineral with formula:  . It crystallizes in the monoclinic crystal system and typically occurs as elongated and striated slender prisms which may be columnar to fibrous. Its crystals may be pinkish to yellowish brown or red-orange.

It was first described in 1878 for an occurrence in the Branchville Quarry, Branchville, Fairfield County, Connecticut. The name is derived from its resemblance to triplite.

It typically occurs as a hydrothermal alteration product of primary phosphate minerals in granite pegmatites. It occurs with triplite, lithiophilite, triphylite, eosphorite, dickinsonite and rhodochrosite.

It forms a solid solution series with the iron rich wolfeite.

See also

 Classification of minerals
 List of minerals

References

Manganese(II) minerals
Iron(II) minerals
Phosphate minerals
Monoclinic minerals
Minerals in space group 14